Deep Run Hunt Club Rosedale Lodge is a historic building in Richmond, Virginia, United States.

History 
In 1895, Lewis Ginter hired architect D. Wiley Anderson to remodel Rosedale Lodge and enlarge what was originally a four-room brick farmhouse from the early 1800s. The construction was completed in the year 1896.

On April 17, 2010, the property was added to Virginia Landmarks Registry and on May 21, 2019, the property got listed on the National Register of Historic Places.

References 

National Register of Historic Places in Richmond, Virginia